Donacia tomentosa is a species of leaf beetle, that is distributed throughout Palearctic region, and from Southern France to Central Siberia.

Description
The males of the species have a gray coloured wings and are smaller comparing to females, while females have green.

References

Beetles described in 1810
Beetles of Europe
Taxa named by August Ahrens
Donaciinae